Gerard Granollers and Lukáš Rosol were the defending champions but chose not to defend their title.

Teymuraz Gabashvili and Carlos Gómez-Herrera won the title after defeating Lucas Miedler and Tristan-Samuel Weissborn 6–3, 6–2 in the final.

Seeds

Draw

References

External links
 Main draw

Tilia Slovenia Open - Doubles
2019 Doubles